Astronaut is the eleventh studio album by English new wave band Duran Duran. It was released on 28 September 2004 by Epic Records. It was Duran Duran's first studio album since Pop Trash (2000), and the first (and to date, last) full album since Seven and the Ragged Tiger (1983) to be recorded by the most famous five-member lineup of the band (the stand-alone 1985 single "A View to a Kill" was their last studio recording together).

Astronaut received mixed reviews from critics but was nevertheless a commercial success, peaking at number 3 on the UK Albums Chart to become the band's highest-charting album in the UK since Seven and the Ragged Tiger in 1983. The album also peaked at 17 on the U.S. Billboard 200 and reached the top ten in six other countries.

Background and recording
Duran Duran originally announced a reunion of the most famous five members in 2001, and began writing new music together in the south of France. They continued to write and record intermittently, working hard for a few months at a time, throughout 2002 and 2003. The band's friend Nile Rodgers did preliminary production work on several tracks.

Meanwhile, the search for a record label went on, complicated by the band's desire for independence, control, strong promotional support and a commitment for more than one album at the same time that the reportedly cash-strapped and risk-averse recording industry was unwilling to gamble on the "leftover fame" of a band best known for a series of 20-year-old hits.

The band, frustrated and with nearly thirty new songs approaching completion, set out on a world tour in 2003 to show that the band still had drawing power. The sold-out dates in Japan, the United States, the United Kingdom and Australia and New Zealand—and the nearly delirious news coverage that followed the reunited band—warmed the record labels to the possibilities. The new songs "Sunrise", "Still Breathing", "Virus", "Beautiful Colours" and "What Happens Tomorrow" were played during these concerts; John Taylor also played a demo recording of "What Happens Tomorrow" on the air at Los Angeles radio station STAR 98.7 in May 2003.

During this period, a "teaser CD" with short demo versions of a few of the unfinished songs (used to demonstrate the new work to potential labels and producers) was leaked to the Internet and quickly copied throughout the band's fan base. The songs were "Virus", "Sunrise", "TV vs. Radio", "Taste the Summer", "Salt in the Rainbow", and "Pretty Ones". The band was very unhappy about the leak, and with the exception of "Sunrise" (which became the first single) and "Taste the Summer", the leaked songs were not included in the final track listing for the album. Jason Nevins also remixed "Virus", which was not released as a single. (The Jason Nevins version of "Virus" later appeared as a bonus track on a Japanese release of Astronaut).

A remix of "Sunrise" by Jason Nevins was included on the Queer Eye for the Straight Guy soundtrack in February; it received a warm reception by DJs anticipating new work from Duran Duran, but the song was not released as a single from the soundtrack. The band has generally performed the Jason Nevins version live in concert. The main version of the CD incorporates tracks from Jason Nevins' production, to which he is credited on the album's liner notes.

In March, the band donated "Beautiful Colours" to FIFA, the international governing body for football, to use as its Centennial song. At the awards ceremony for the FIFA 100, honouring the top living footballers, a video of top moments in the sport was accompanied by the song. However, the song would not be one of those that made the final version of the album.

Release and promotion
Following lengthy negotiations, the band signed a four-album deal with Epic Records in June 2004. The songs were given a final polishing with producer Don Gilmore at Sphere Studios in London, and then mixed by Jeremy Wheatley throughout June and July 2004. R&B producer Dallas Austin produced three tracks on the album, and Nile Rodgers' early production work remains on another three.

Sony BMG reissued Astronaut on the DualDisc format on 29 March 2005. This double-sided disc included the CD version on one side and a remixed 5.1 DVD-Audio surround mix of the album on the other side. The DVD side also included a 25-minute program with new, behind-the-scenes footage. On 20 December 2005, Astronaut was released on the SACD format. Similarly to DualDisc, this release featured the album in three formats—multichannel SACD, stereo SACD and stereo CD.

Limited copies of the new album were released with a bonus DVD which included 45 minutes of live and behind-the-scenes footage from Wembley Arena, recorded in April 2004. The CD/DVD set came in DVD-sized packaging and European copies bore copy protection, a holdover from the BMG days.

A worldwide media tour accompanied the release of the first single, "(Reach Up for The) Sunrise", with more surrounding the release of Astronaut in October. The pace became too hectic for guitarist Andy Taylor, and in November Duran Duran announced he was suffering from exhaustion and flu, and would not be participating in band promotion until January 2005.  The remaining four members continued with television appearances, and a stand-in guitarist, Dominic Brown, was hired for the scheduled radio station Christmas concerts in December. Subsequently, January concert dates in Japan had to be postponed until the summer, after drummer Roger Taylor broke a bone in his right foot in December.

In 2021, the band signed a deal for the album with BMG (along with Medazzaland, Pop Trash and Red Carpet Massacre) which saw it being re-issued in the UK on various digital platforms.

Critical reception

Astronaut was met with "mixed or average" reviews from critics. At Metacritic, which assigns a weighted average rating out of 100 to reviews from mainstream publications, this release received an average score of 52 based on 17 reviews.

In a review for AllMusic, Andy Kellman wrote: "Even with a handful of forgettable songs beyond that, the album is easily the best one credited to the Duran Duran name since 1993's Wedding Album." Matt Dentler of The Austin Chronicle called the album an "overproduced synth shuffle", going on to say "With too many songs trying too hard, Duranies will still go hungry for quality."

Commercial performance
Astronaut debuted at number three on the UK Albums Chart and at number 17 on the US Billboard 200, with similar top-20 debuts elsewhere in the world.  Meanwhile, the CD/DVD set debuted at number one on the Billboard Top Music Video chart. The album peaked at number 29 in Japan.
 
The first single, "(Reach Up for The) Sunrise", was released in the US on 30 August 2004 and in the UK on 4 October 2004. It debuted at number five on the UK Singles Chart. In late November, it topped the Billboard Hot Dance Club Play chart.

The second single, "What Happens Tomorrow", was released on 18 January 2005 in the US and on 31 January 2005 in the UK. It entered the UK chart at number 11 (where it peaked). It slowly gained radio play in the US, supported by a nearly sold-out tour of North American arenas and stadiums, touted as the band's "largest tour ever". Later in 2005, "What Happens Tomorrow" was used in a promotional spot for the US digital cable network Fox Soccer Channel; Simon Le Bon and John Taylor had also appeared in a separate spot for the network. Andy Taylor missed several American dates in February and March to visit his ill father and the subsequent funeral.

Live favourite "Nice" was announced to be the next single in Europe to coincide with the band's tour there. It was believed that the single would not have a commercial release or music video but would be downloadable. However, "Nice" was only released to radio in Europe, was promoted poorly, and disappeared quickly from the airwaves.

Astronaut has been certified "Gold" in the UK for sales of over 100,000 copies. It was certified Gold in Italy. As of 2008, it had sold around 260,000 copies in the US.

Track listing

Notes
  signifies a vocal producer
  signifies an additional producer
  signifies a pre-production

Personnel
Credits adapted from the liner notes of Astronaut.

Duran Duran
 Simon Le Bon
 Nick Rhodes
 Andy Taylor – background vocals 
 John Taylor
 Roger Taylor

Additional musicians

 Mark Tinley – programming 
 Lily Gonzalez – additional percussion 
 Guy Farley – string arrangement 
 Sally Boyden – background vocals 
 Tessa Niles – background vocals 
 Jason Nevins – additional programming

Technical

 Duran Duran – executive production, production
 Don Gilmore – production ; additional production ; engineering 
 Nile Rodgers – vocal production ; additional production ; production 
 Dallas Austin – production , engineering 
 Mark Tinley – pre-production, engineering 
 Jeremy Wheatley – mixing at Townhouse Studios, London
 Leon Zervos – mastering at Sterling Sound, New York City
 Rich Hilton – Pro Tools, engineering 
 Daniel Mendez – Pro Tools, additional engineering 
 Rick Sheppard – Pro Tools, additional engineering 
 Francesco Cameli – engineering assistance 
 Richard Edgeler – engineering assistance 
 Dean Barratt – engineering assistance 
 Jason Nevins – additional recording

Artwork

 Kristian Schuller – cover photography
 Richard Haughton – guitar photography
 FAILE – art
 Clarissa Tossin – art
 Sean Hogan – art
 Bernie Beca – art
 Patty Palazzo – art
 John Warwicker – creative direction, graphics remix
 Sara Syms – graphic art

Charts

Certifications

Release history

References

External links

 Duran Duran discography 

2004 albums
Albums produced by Dallas Austin
Albums produced by Nile Rodgers
Duran Duran albums
Epic Records albums